Nike or Nice, or Nicaea or Nikaia (Νίκαια), or Nicae, was a town of Thrace, not far from Adrianople, the scene of the defeat and death of the emperor Valens by the Goths in 378. 

The site is located near Havsa in modern Turkey.

References

Populated places in ancient Thrace
Former populated places in Turkey